William Agee (December 25, 1905 – March 26, 1954) was an American long-distance runner. He competed in the marathon at the 1928 Summer Olympics. Agee commmitted suicide by carbon monoxide poisoning in 1954.

References

External links

1905 births
1954 suicides
Athletes (track and field) at the 1928 Summer Olympics
American male long-distance runners
American male marathon runners
Olympic track and field athletes of the United States
Sportspeople from Richmond, Virginia
Suicides in Maryland
Suicides by carbon monoxide poisoning
20th-century American people